Falu River (Swedish: Faluån) is a river in Sweden. It runs from lake Varpan to lake Runn and passes through the town of Falun.

Rivers of Dalarna County